{{DISPLAYTITLE:C30H52O}}
The molecular formula C30H52O (molar mass: 428.73 g/mol) may refer to:

 Ambrein
 Dinosterol
 Friedelanol (3α-Friedelanol)
 Epifriedelanol (3β-Friedelanol)
 Tetrahymanol
 24,25-dihydrolanosterol